Nocardioides lentus is a Gram-positive bacterium from the genus Nocardioides which has been isolated from alkaline soil in Korea.

References

External links
Type strain of Nocardioides lentus at BacDive -  the Bacterial Diversity Metadatabase	

lentus
Bacteria described in 2006